The rufous-gorgeted flycatcher (Ficedula strophiata) is a species of bird in the family Muscicapidae.

It is found in the Indian Subcontinent and Southeast Asia, ranging across Bangladesh, Bhutan, Hong Kong, India, Laos, Myanmar, Nepal, Thailand, and Vietnam. Its natural habitat is subtropical or tropical moist montane forests. The rufous-gorgeted flycatcher is also common in the northern Kachin State of Myanmar, in temperate forest areas near boreal mountains. They spend winters in places like Thailand, North Laos, and Vietnam, and the Himalayas are a major breeding range. As the name denotes, they are known for their reddish brown color with a distinctly colored patch on their throat.

References

rufous-gorgeted flycatcher
Birds of Central China
Birds of Nepal
Birds of North India
Birds of Eastern Himalaya
Birds of Laos
Birds of Myanmar
Birds of Vietnam
Birds of Yunnan
rufous-gorgeted flycatcher
Taxonomy articles created by Polbot